Kåre Huseby Bulie (born 14 August 1975) is a Norwegian journalist and literary critic.

He is a literary critic in Dagbladet since 2006. He worked in Dagens Næringsliv from 1997 to 2006, and also in VG and Morgenbladet. He has a cand.mag. degree from the University of Oslo in 2002.

References

1975 births
Living people
Norwegian literary critics
University of Oslo alumni